is a former Japanese football player and manager.

Playing career
Muto was born in Sendai on April 2, 1973. After graduating from high school, he joined JEF United Ichihara in 1992. He debuted in 1994 and became a regular player as left side back and left side midfielder from 1997. In 2000s, he mainly played as defensive midfielder. In 2003, his opportunity to play decreased and he moved to Oita Trinita in June 2003. From 2004, he played as playing manager for Grulla Morioka (2004–05) and FC Ganju Iwate (2006-07). He retired end of 2007 season.

Coaching career
In 2004, when Muto was player, he moved to Grulla Morioka and became a playing manager. He moved to FC Ganju Iwate in 2006 and became a playing manager. End of 2007 season, he retired from playing career and he left the club.

Club statistics

References

External links

1973 births
Living people
Association football people from Miyagi Prefecture
Japanese footballers
J1 League players
JEF United Chiba players
Oita Trinita players
Iwate Grulla Morioka players
Japanese football managers
Iwate Grulla Morioka managers
Association football midfielders